Don Adams (1923–2005) was an American actor.

Don Adams may also refer to:

Musicians
Don Adams (country singer) 1960s, American country singer
Don Adams (R&B singer) (1942–1995), Munich based Scottish singer
Donald Adams (1928–1996), opera singer and actor

Sports
Donald Adams (cricketer) (1880–1976), English cricketer
Don Adams (rugby league), Australian rugby league footballer for Scone Thoroughbreds
Don Adams (boxer), British bare-knuckle boxer
Don Adams (basketball) (1947–2013), American basketball player
Don Adams (footballer) (1931–1993), English footballer

Other uses
Don Alden Adams (born 1925), president of the Watch Tower Bible and Tract Society of Pennsylvania
Don Adams (politician), Texas politician and legislator

See also
Donald Adams (disambiguation)
Adams (surname)